Rochelle Lee Shoretz (July 27, 1972 – May 31, 2015) was an American lawyer and founder and executive director of Sharsheret, an organization supporting young Jewish women with cancer.

Early life and education
Rochelle Lee Shoretz was born in 1972 in Brooklyn, the daughter of Morris Shoretz and Sherry Tenenbaum. She attended Shulamith High School, Barnard College and Columbia Law School. During her undergraduate years at Barnard, she married, and during law school she worked as a speech writer for David Dinkins.

Law career and cancer advocacy
Shoretz was a law clerk at the United States Supreme Court, serving under Ruth Bader Ginsburg in 1998 and 1999. She was believed to be the first Orthodox Jewish woman to clerk at the Supreme Court.

In 2001, soon after her time at the Supreme Court ended, at age 28, Shoretz learned that she had breast cancer. "You have these life plans at 28 years old that you don't really consider will be altered by a major medical crisis at that age," she remembered. Experiencing first-hand the challenges of young motherhood with cancer, and aware that women of Ashkenazic descent had a higher risk of some cancers, she founded Sharsheret in 2001, for young Jewish women facing cancer. The organization grew to a nationwide organization, with a budget over $2 million per year, and a grant from the Centers for Disease Control to expand its programming.

In 2003, Rochelle Shoretz was honored as a "Woman to be Watched" by Jewish Women International.

In 2010, Shoretz was appointed to the Federal Advisory Committee on Breast Cancer in Young Women. She was one of the featured profiles in Heroes for my Daughter, a 2012 book by Brad Meltzer.

Personal life
Rochelle Shoretz married and divorced twice. She had two sons. During several years of remission, Shoretz trained for and ran triathlons and traveled widely, to Peru and South Africa and Israel.

Rochelle Shoretz died in Teaneck, New Jersey in 2015, age 42, from cancer.

See also 
 List of law clerks of the Supreme Court of the United States (Seat 6)

References

1972 births
2015 deaths
20th-century American Jews
Barnard College alumni
Columbia Law School alumni
Law clerks of the Supreme Court of the United States
American health activists
21st-century American Jews